Nordlit is a Norwegian academic journal that publishes articles on Nordic literature and culture. Most issues are multilingual—including English, French, and German, as well as Norwegian, Swedish, and Danish. The journal is published by Septentrio Academic Publishing on behalf of the University of Tromsø. It has a specific focus on Arctic themes and border studies, as well as Scandinavian literature. The editors-in-chief are Linda Nesby, Henrik Johnsson, Andreas Klein, Ingri Løkholm Ramberg, and Monica Grini (University of Tromsø).

The name Nordlit is a paronomasia: in Norwegian, nordlys means northern lights; and the suffix -lit refers to literature.

Abstracting and indexing
The journal is abstracted and indexed in the Modern Language Association Database. The journal is a level 1 publication in the Norwegian scientific rating system.

References

External links

Nordic literature
1997 establishments in Norway
Academic journals of Norway
Area studies journals
Publications established in 1997
Multilingual journals
Danish-language journals
English-language journals
French-language journals
German-language journals
Norwegian-language journals
Swedish-language journals